Angel's Holiday is a 1937 American comedy film directed by James Tinling and written by Frank Fenton and Lynn Root. The film stars Jane Withers, Joan Davis, Sally Blane, Robert Kent, Harold Huber and Frank Jenks. The film was released on June 7, 1937, by 20th Century Fox.

Plot

Cast   
Jane Withers as June 'Angel' Everett
Joan Davis as Strivers
Sally Blane as Pauline Kaye
Robert Kent as Nick Moore
Harold Huber as Bat Regan
Frank Jenks as Butch Broder
Ray Walker as Crandall
John Qualen as Waldo Everett
Lon Chaney, Jr. as Eddie
Al Lydell as Gramp Hiram Seely
Russell Hopton as Gus
Paul Hurst as Sgt. Murphy
 John Kelly as Maxie
George Taylor as Eddie
Cy Kendall as Chief of Police
Charles Arnt as Everett

References

External links 
 

1937 films
20th Century Fox films
American comedy films
1937 comedy films
Films directed by James Tinling
American black-and-white films
Films scored by Samuel Kaylin
1930s English-language films
1930s American films